Zhukovo is a rural locality (a village) in Soshnevskoye Rural Settlement, Ustyuzhensky District, Vologda Oblast, Russia. The population was 88 as of 2002.

Geography 
Zyablikovo is the nearest rural locality.

References 

Rural localities in Ustyuzhensky District